Brassaiopsis is a genus of shrubs in the family Araliaceae. There are about 45 species, distributed in Asia from the Himalaya through China, Vietnam, Thailand to Indonesia.

Species
Species include:
Brassaiopsis aculeata (Buch.-Ham. ex D.Don) Seem.
Brassaiopsis acuminata H.L.Li
Brassaiopsis andamanica R.N.Banerjee
Brassaiopsis angustifolia K.M.Feng
Brassaiopsis bodinieri (H.Lév.) J.Wen & Lowry
Brassaiopsis calcarea Craib
Brassaiopsis castaneifolia Philipson
Brassaiopsis chengkangensis Hu
Brassaiopsis ciliata Dunn
Brassaiopsis dumicola W.W.Sm.
Brassaiopsis elegans Ridl.
Brassaiopsis fatsioides Harms
Brassaiopsis ferruginea (H.L.Li) G.Hoo
Brassaiopsis ficifolia Dunn
Brassaiopsis ficifolioides J.Wen & Lowry
Brassaiopsis floribunda (Miq.) Seem.
Brassaiopsis gigantea J.Wen & Lowry
Brassaiopsis glomerulata (Blume) Regel
Brassaiopsis gracilis Hand.-Mazz.
Brassaiopsis griffithii C.B.Clarke
Brassaiopsis grushvitzkyi J.Wen, Lowry & T.H.Nguyên
Brassaiopsis hainla (Buch.-Ham.) Seem.
Brassaiopsis hispida Seem.
Brassaiopsis hookeri C.B.Clarke
Brassaiopsis kwangsiensis G.Hoo
Brassaiopsis liana Y.F.Deng
Brassaiopsis magnifica Dunn
Brassaiopsis minor B.C.Stone
Brassaiopsis mitis C.B.Clarke
Brassaiopsis moumingensis (Y.R.Ling) C.B.Shang
Brassaiopsis nhatrangensis (Bui) J.Wen & Lowry
Brassaiopsis phanrangensis C.B.Shang
Brassaiopsis producta (Dunn) C.B.Shang
Brassaiopsis pseudoficifolia Lowry & C.B.Shang
Brassaiopsis quercifolia G.Hoo
Brassaiopsis resecta (Miq.) Esser & Jebb
Brassaiopsis rockii Merr.
Brassaiopsis rufosetosa (Ridl.) Jebb
Brassaiopsis shweliensis W.W.Sm.
Brassaiopsis simplex (King) B.C.Stone
Brassaiopsis simplicifolia C.B.Clarke
Brassaiopsis stellata K.M.Feng
Brassaiopsis sumatrana (Miq.) Ridl.
Brassaiopsis tibetana C.B.Shang
Brassaiopsis triloba K.M.Feng
Brassaiopsis trilobata Merr.
Brassaiopsis tripteris (H.Lév.) Rehder
Brassaiopsis variabilis C.B.Shang

References

 
Apiales genera
Taxa named by Joseph Decaisne
Taxa named by Jules Émile Planchon